Lieutenant General Zola Dabula (born 1956) is a South African military officer, who served as the Surgeon General of the South African Military Health Service.

Early life
Zola Wiseman Songo Dabula was born in the former homeland of the Transkei in 1956. Having graduated from the University of Natal medical school, at the time reserved for black students, he returned to Umtata where he became involved in underground ANC structures. This led to his arrest, during which he shared a cell with an American priest Fr. Casimir Paulsen, both enduring torture at the hands of the apartheid regime.

Military career
With the dawn of democracy in South Africa Dabula integrated into the newly formed South African National Defence Force where he served in various roles, ultimately being appointed Surgeon General in 2019.

As executive head of the SANDF Presidential Medical Unit, Dr. Dabula oversaw the healthcare of President Nelson Mandela.

Controversy 
Lieutenant General Dabula was summoned to parliament to explain his role in the illegal importation by the South African Department of Defence of the Cuban produced drug interferon, which was being considered as a potential prophylactic against COVID-19.

References

1956 births
Living people
South African generals